Werauhia apiculata is a plant species in the genus Werauhia. This species is endemic to Costa Rica.

References

apiculata
Flora of Costa Rica